Sir William Beechey  (12 December 175328 January 1839) was an English portraitist during the golden age of British painting.

Early life

Beechey was born at Burford, Oxfordshire, on 12 December 1753, the son of William Beechey, a solicitor, and his wife Hannah Read.  Both parents died when he was still quite young in the early 1760s, and he and his siblings were brought up by his uncle Samuel, a solicitor who lived in nearby Chipping Norton.  

The uncle was determined that the young Beechey should likewise follow a career in the law, and at an appropriate age he was entered as a clerk with a conveyancer near Stow-on-the-Wold. But as The Monthly Mirror later recorded in July 1798, he was: "Early foredoomed his [uncle's] soul to cross/ And paint a picture where he should engross."

Career

Beechey was admitted to the Royal Academy Schools in 1772, where he is thought to have studied under Johan Zoffany. He first exhibited at the Academy in 1776. His earliest surviving portraits are small-scale full-length and conversation pieces which are reminiscent of Zoffany. In 1782, he moved to Norwich, where he gained several commissions, including a portrait of Sir John Wodehouse and a series of civic portraits for St. Andrew's Hall, Norwich. By 1787, he had returned to London, and in 1789, he exhibited a celebrated portrait of John Douglas, Bishop of Carlisle (now in Lambeth Palace). Beechey's career during this period is marked by a succession of adept and restrained portraits in the tradition of Sir Joshua Reynolds.

Beechey's style perfectly suited the conventional taste of the royal family, and in 1793, he was commissioned to paint a full-length portrait of Queen Charlotte and subsequently named as her official portrait painter. That same year, he was elected as an associate member of the Royal Academy. 

Following his royal appointment, the number of royal commissions he undertook increased markedly, and in 1797 he exhibited six royal portraits. In 1798, he was elected a full member of the Royal Academy and painted George III and the Prince of Wales Reviewing Troops for that year's academy's exhibition. This enormous composition depicts King George III, the Prince of Wales and staff officers on horseback at an imagined cavalry review in Hyde Park. The king was reported to be delighted with the painting and rewarded Beechey with a knighthood. 

Joseph Farington's Diaries give many accounts of Beechey's relations with the royal family during this period, including his temporary fall from favour in 1804, which Farington attributes to the vagaries of George III's mental condition.

Beechey's portraits of the turn of the century are considered to be his most colourful and lively. They are closer to the flamboyant and free techniques employed by his younger rivals, John Hoppner and Sir Thomas Lawrence.

Royal patronage resumed in around 1813, when Beechey was appointed portrait painter to Prince William Frederick, Duke of Gloucester, and culminated with his appointment in 1830 as principal portrait painter to King William IV. In 1836, Beechey retired to Hampstead and on 9–11 June that year, the contents of his studio along with his collection were sold at Christie's.

Although capable of impetuousness and irascibility, Beechey was known for his generosity to students. In particular, he took a close interest in the career of the young John Constable.

Subjects

During a prolific career spanning half a century, Beechey painted many of the leading figures of his day. His sitters included:

In his 1978 novel Desolation Island, Patrick O'Brian wrote that Capt. Jack Aubrey had been painted by Beechey.  The portrait, which showed Aubrey in Royal Navy uniform wearing the insignia of the Order of the Bath, hung in his home, Ashgrove Cottage.

Family
William Beechey's first marriage was to Mary Ann Jones (c. 1760–1793) in 1772 (other sources say 1778). Their children included British painter and Egyptologist Henry William Beechey (1788–1862).

Following his first wife's death, Beechey married the successful miniature painter Anne Phyllis Jessop (1764–1833) in 1793. They had many children together, including: Royal Navy captain, geographer, and politician Frederick William Beechey (1796–1856); painter George Duncan Beechey (1798–1852); clergyman St. Vincent Beechey (1806–1899); and painter and admiral in the British navy Richard Brydges Beechey (1808–1895).

Prices at auction
Beechey's Portrait of James Watt sold for £153,440 at Sotheby's on 20 March 2003. His Portrait of Mirza Abu'l Hassan Khan, Envoy Extraordinary and Minister Plenipotentiary to the Court of King George III sold for £181,600 at Christie's on 8 June 2006. His Portrait of George Douglas, 16th Earl of Morton in the dress of the Royal Company of Archers sold for £481,250 at Christie's on 5 July 2011. His portrait of The Dashwood Children sold at auction for $821,000 including premium at Christie's on 29 January 2014.

Gallery
Beechey's works are represented in many of the world's leading collections, including the Louvre, the Smithsonian Institution, the Royal Collection, the Royal Academy of Arts, the National Portrait Gallery, London, the Tate and the Metropolitan Museum of Art.

Coat of arms
Beechey was granted arms on 16 February 1829.

References

Sources

External links

 

1753 births
1839 deaths
18th-century English painters
English male painters
19th-century English painters
People from Burford
English portrait painters
Royal Academicians
English knights
18th-century English male artists